Corcoran is a rural city in Hennepin County, Minnesota, United States. The population was 5,379 at the 2010 census.

Geography
County Roads 10, 19, 30, 50, 116, and 117 are six of the main routes. Minnesota State Highway 55 briefly passes along the southern edge of the city.

Corcoran shares borders with five cities. Maple Grove to the east, Medina to the south, Greenfield to the west, Rogers to the north, and Hanover in the northwest portion of the city. Dayton, Plymouth, Rockford, and Loretto are located close to Corcoran.

History
Corcoran was settled in 1855, and was organized on May 11, 1858. The city is named after Patrick B. Corcoran, the first schoolteacher, merchant, and postmaster of the town.  Patrick B. Corcoran was originally from Ireland, but moved to the United States in 1847, and to Hennepin County in 1855.  The city of Corcoran was incorporated on December 4, 1948.

Demographics

2010 census
As of the census of 2010, there were 5,379 people, 1,867 households, and 1,543 families living in the city. The racial makeup of the city was 92.8% White, 0.4% African American, 0.5% Native American, 3.4% Asian, 1.7% from other races, and 1.2% from two or more races. Hispanic or Latino of any race were 2.8% of the population.

There were 1,867 households, of which 33.6% had children under the age of 18 living with them, 73.2% were married couples living together, 5.0% had a female householder with no husband present, 4.4% had a male householder with no wife present, and 17.4% were non-families. 12.4% of all households were made up of individuals, and 3.1% had someone living alone who was 65 years of age or older. The average household size was 2.88 and the average family size was 3.14.

The median age in the city was 44.4 years. 25.1% of residents were under the age of 18; 7.8% were between the ages of 18 and 24; 18.1% were from 25 to 44; 39.7% were from 45 to 64; and 9.3% were 65 years of age or older. The gender makeup of the city was 52.0% male and 48.0% female.

2000 census
As of the census of 2000, there were 5,630 people, 1,784 households, and 1,512 families living in the city. The racial makeup of the city was 96.70% White, 0.20% African American, 0.20% Native American, 1.76% Asian, 0.37% from other races, and 0.78% from two or more races. Hispanic or Latino of any race were 0.87% of the population. 36.3% were of German, 15.4% Norwegian, 7.8% Swedish and 7.0% Irish ancestry.

There were 1,784 households, out of which 47.6% had children under the age of 18 living with them, 76.5% were married couples living together, 5.0% had a female householder with no husband present, and 15.2% were non-families. 10.5% of all households were made up of individuals, and 2.2% had someone living alone who was 65 years of age or older.  The average household size was 3.16 and the average family size was 3.42.

In the city, the population was spread out, with 32.7% under the age of 18, 6.8% from 18 to 24, 31.6% from 25 to 44, 24.4% from 45 to 64, and 4.5% who were 65 years of age or older.  The median age was 36 years. For every 100 females, there were 108.5 males.  For every 100 females age 18 and over, there were 108.5 males.

The median income for a household in the city was $78,984, and the median income for a family was $81,322. Males had a median income of $46,491 versus $34,078 for females. The per capita income for the city was $29,467.  About 0.5% of families and 0.9% of the population were below the poverty line, including 0.5% of those under age 18 and 4.4% of those age 65 or over.

References

External links
 
 City of Corcoran Official Website

Cities in Minnesota
Cities in Hennepin County, Minnesota
Populated places established in 1858
1858 establishments in Minnesota